Enamakkal Lake is a fresh water lake situated in Enamakkal of Thrissur District in Kerala State, India. The lake covers about 25 square kilometres.

History 
On western side of the lake, it is protected by a bund which was the brain child of Sakthan Thampuran. In his letter to the Collector of Malabar in 1802, he proposed a bund to control the salt water. The Keecheri River and Viyyoor River joins Enamakkal Lake.

References

Geography of Thrissur district
Lakes of Kerala